John Gregory Kemp (21 March 1940 – 28 December 1993) was an association football player who represented New Zealand at international level and played first class cricket for Auckland.

Football career
Kemp made his full New Zealand debut in a 5–1 win over Tahiti on 5 September 1960 and ended his international playing career with four official A-international caps to his credit, his final cap an appearance in a 4–2 win over New Caledonia on 4 June 1962.

Cricket career
He played 25 matches for Auckland Cricket Association in the Plunket Shield from 1960/61 to 1969/70, scoring 1086 runs at an average of 27.15, with a top score of 108 amongst his three first class centuries.

References

External links

1940 births
1993 deaths
New Zealand association footballers
New Zealand international footballers
New Zealand cricketers
Auckland cricketers
Association football central defenders